The Young Marines is a youth program in the United States and Japan open to all  youth  between  the  ages  of  8  to  18  or
high  school graduation (whichever  is  later,  not  to  exceed  20  years  of
age). The Young Marines program is the leader in youth Drug Demand Reduction (DDR) education and has received many accolades for its DDR programs (drug prevention and resistance).  It has been awarded the United States Department Of Defense's Fulcrum Shield Award 12 times, with the last one awarded in 2022. The program has partnered up with National Family Partnership to help keep kids off drugs.  The Young Marines take part in Red Ribbon Week and hold activities and events that take place during that week in October to push drug prevention and resistance efforts nationally.  A documentary released in 2019, but filmed much earlier (somewhere between 2008-2010) The Recruits, has brought the Young Marines under renewed scrutiny The organization equates their program to a summer camp, but critics consider the program a violation of international human rights law, which forbids military recruitment or training of children under the age of 15.

Role and purpose 

 To promote the mental, moral, and physical development in its members the principles of honesty, fairness, courage, respect, loyalty, dependability, attention to duty, and fidelity to the United States and its institutions
 To stimulate an interest in, and respect for academic achievement and the history and traditions of the United States and the U.S. Marine Corps
 Their three core values are leadership, discipline, and teamwork
 To promote the physical fitness through the conduct of physical activities, including athletic events and close order drill
 To advocate a healthy drug-free lifestyle by continual drug prevention education programs, including avoiding gateway drugs

The creed that every Young Marine lives by is:
 Obey my parents and all others in charge of me whether young or old.
 Keep myself neat at all times without other people telling me to.
 Keep myself clean in mind by attending the church of my faith.
 Keep my mind alert to learn in school, at home, or at play.
 Remember that having self-discipline will enable me to control my body and mind in case of an emergency.

The obligation which they stand by is: "From this day forward,  I sincerely promise, I will set an example for all other youth to follow and I shall never do anything that would bring disgrace or dishonor upon my God, my country and its flag, my parents, myself or the Young Marines. These I will honor and respect in a manner that will reflect credit upon them and myself. Semper Fidelis."

US Congress found in the Recruiting, Retention, and Reservist Promotion Act of 2000 that Young Marines and similar programs "provide significant benefits for the Armed Forces, including significant public relations benefits."

The Young Marines are not a recruitment tool for militaries of any sort, combat skills are not taught, and it is not a "Scared Straight Program" for wayward youth. At the same time, events that Young Marines may participate in may involve close connection with public relations aspects of the armed forces.

Organization 

The Young Marines was founded in 1959, by the Brass City detachment of the Marine Corps League in Waterbury, CT.  The Young Marines received its charter on October 17, 1965, and continued its affiliation with the MCL as well as becoming US Marine Corps drug demand reduction program for youth in July 1993. In 1975 the Young Marines extended its membership to females, and in 1995 the program went international with units in Okinawa, Japan. The Young Marine program was awarded the Fulcrum Shield in 2001. This was the first Fulcrum Shield Award ever bestowed.

The Young Marines are different from Junior ROTC units, in that they are not part of a high school and are a 501(c)3 non-profit instead of a government agency. The program is open to children from the ages of eight years old through high school graduation. Most units require an initial registration fee ranging from twenty five to two hundred dollars to enroll, with an annual re-registration fee ranging from twenty to fifty dollars a year. Generally, units meet on local military bases or other locations such as American Legion, VFW, Fire or Sheriff Dept. etc. where a building serves as their headquarters and classroom.

The organization has over 235 units with over 6,100 Young Marines and 2,100 adult volunteers in 40 states, the District of Columbia, and affiliates in a host of foreign countries including Japan.

The Young Marines have 6 divisions, each with multiple regiments. The command is from national headquarters, to division, to regiment, to unit. Unit commanders are typically retired or former marines with an honorable discharge, or active duty or reserve marines in good standing, but exceptions can be made on a case by case basis.
For additional information see the YM national website.

Activities 

Young Marines learn survival techniques, physical training, hiking, swimming, rock climbing, rappelling, scuba diving, etc. depending upon the geographic location of the unit, and  undergo leadership training, such as Junior Leadership School, Senior Leadership School, and Advanced Leadership School.  Different schools can be viewed on the Young Marines website.  All divisions train differently, so schools may vary. Most schools are done at Camp Rilea in Oregon for Nationals, but some regiments, or divisions will do smaller leadership schools. All Young Marines learn close order drill based on the U.S. Marine Corps and practice those skills in community parades; some units may have their own drill team.

All units accept new members differently as part of recruit training. Some units train new recruits over a period of several months, led by several recruit instructors (RI's), while other units train new members over a course of a few weekend meetings, while at least one unit has a 4-day long encampment for recruit training. At the end of recruit training, members are officially given the title of "Young Marine," are allowed to wear the standard camouflage uniform, and earn the rank of private (those that have not completed recruit training successfully are allowed to take part in most unit activities, but do not hold the rank of private). Honor recruits, recruits that have done exceptionally well during their training period, may begin with the rank of private first class.

Upon earning sufficient rank, Young Marines may enroll in a leadership school in order to enhance their leadership skills. Junior Leadership School (JLS) is available for Young Marine lance corporals and corporals, and is necessary for advancement to the rank of sergeant. The curriculum at JLS often involves leadership skills, map and compass navigation, U.S. and Young Marine history, duties of billeted positions, and squad drill. Senior Leadership School (SLS), teaching platoon drill and advanced leadership skills, is available for sergeants and staff sergeants, and is necessary for advancement to the rank of gunnery sergeant. Upon attainment of sufficient rank, Advanced Leadership School (ALS) is possible, and it is a requirement for the highest rank of master gunnery sergeant.

Uniforms 
The standard Young Marine uniform is the "M81" woodland-patterned BDU. Unlike the Marine Corps Junior ROTC (MCJROTC), the Young Marines are not authorized to wear the MARPAT-patterned camouflage utility uniform. As for dress uniform, the current dress uniforms allowed are Service Alphas, Bravos, and Charlies. The U.S. Marine Corps Eagle, Globe and Anchor emblem is replaced with a gold Young Marines emblem on all uniforms where an EGA would be used in the USMC. On service uniforms, the garrison cover is the only headgear permitted. Marine Corps dress blues are not authorized for the Young Marines, unlike in the MCJROTC, whose units are allowed to wear modified Blue Dress "A" and "B" for balls and other formal events.

Rank 
When Young Marines first join the program they will enter as a recruit, spending anywhere from 3–4 months at that rank. After graduation they are considered a Young Marine Private (Pvt) (unless they receive the title of Honor Recruit, which advances them to the rank of Private first class (PFC).  In larger recruit classes, additional recruits can also be promoted to PFC.  These meritorious promotions to PFC does not excuse the Young Marine from completing the PFC requirements before earning the next rank. After that, the Young Marine will have to advance to higher rank based on actual rank in the United States Marine Corps. The rank structure, in ascending order, goes as follows: Private (YM/Pvt), Private first class (YM/PFC), Lance Corporal (YM/LCpl), Corporal (YM/Cpl), Sergeant (YM/Sgt), Staff Sergeant (YM/SSgt), Gunnery Sergeant (YM/GySgt), Master Sergeant (YM/MSgt), and then finally to Master Gunnery Sergeant (Ym/MGySgt). After the completion of Master Sergeant (YM/MSgt) you can be billeted as a First Sergeant (YM/1stSgt) or as a Master Gunnery Sergeant (YM/MGySgt) a Young Marine can be billeted as a Sergeant Major (YM/SgtMaj) for a short amount of time.

Young Marines may be billeted with both certain ranks and certain positions. Billeted positions include, but are not limited to, the following: team leader, squad leader, platoon guide, platoon sergeant, platoon leader, unit guide, unit gunnery sergeant, unit first sergeant, and company sergeant major. In some cases, a Young Marine need not have the rank their billet entitles to be granted that billet, such as a Staff Sergeant being able to have the billet of unit Gunnery Sergeant. Billets may also apply to different positions in the organizational structure, from a position within the squad (i.e. squad leader) to the battalion (i.e. battalion sergeant major.) Not all billets may be available, depending upon the size of the unit.

Upon completion of the Young Marines, during an honorable discharge at the end of high school, one may enlist in the U.S. military at the pay-grade of E-2 if the rank of YM/sergeant has been attained in the Young Marines. This typically takes about 3 years.

Ribbons 
To show completion of certain requirements, Young Marines are awarded ribbons and devices. There are currently 58 ribbons that can be earned. Every year a Young Marine is chosen for Young Marine of the Year. There are different types of Young Marines of the Year. There is a Unit Young Marine of the year, Battalion YMOY, Regiment YMOY, Division YMOY, and a National YMOY.

Ribbons are awarded in 4 levels:
 Level 1 – Personal Decorations
 Level 2 – Achievement Awards
 Level 3 – Service Awards
 Level 4 – Qualification Awards
 Distinguished Order of Merit (DOM)

The ribbons awarded to the Young Marines are as follows:

Gallery

See also 
 United States Naval Sea Cadet Corps and Navy League Cadet Corps
 Civil Air Patrol Cadet
 Cadet#United States
 Junior Reserve Officers' Training Corps
 Boy Scouts of America
 Royal Marines Cadets, Royal Marines Section Combined Cadet Force and Royal Marines Volunteer Cadet Corps – British equivalents

References

External links 
 
 Find A Unit
 Young Marines Alumni Association website

Youth organizations established in 1959
1959 establishments in Connecticut
American military youth groups
Articles containing video clips